Leone Efrati (May 16, 1916 – April 16, 1944) was an Italian boxer.

Biography
Efrati was born in Rome, Italy on May 16, 1916.

In December 1938, Efrati visited the U.S. and challenged Leo Rodak. Efrati stayed in the U.S. until 1943.

In 1939, he drew a fight with Pete Lello.

He was murdered on April 16, 1944 in Auschwitz in Holocaust. Efrati is a member of the International Jewish Sports Hall of Fame.

See also
 Victor Perez

References

1916 births
1944 deaths
Italian boxers
Italian people of Jewish descent
Boxers from Rome
International Jewish Sports Hall of Fame inductees
Italian Jews who died in the Holocaust
Italian people who died in Auschwitz concentration camp